The 2004 Danish Cup Final was the final and deciding match of the Danish Cup 2003-04. It took place on Thursday 20 May 2004 at Parken Stadium in Copenhagen and saw the Superliga leaders F.C. Copenhagen beat no. 5 in the league Aalborg Boldspilklub (AaB).

F.C. Copenhagen have won the Cup on two previous occasions (1995 and 1997). AaB have won the Cup in 1966 and 1970.

Referee Michael Svendsen officiated the match.

Road to Copenhagen

 Both teams started in fifth round.
 Square brackets [ ] represent the opposition's division.

Match facts

See also
Danish Cup 2003-04 for details of the current competition.

External links
 Match facts at F.C. Copenhagen
 Match facts at Haslund.info

Danish Cup Finals
Danish Cup Final 2004
Danish Cup Final 2004
Cup
Danish Cup Final 2004
Sports competitions in Copenhagen
2004 in Copenhagen